Moina Lillian Imam, later Moina Furlong (9 April 1924 - 7 March 1988), was chief petty officer from Bihar and was among the first Indian girls to join the Indian Women's Auxiliary Corps (WAC(I)), where she became its poster girl. She died on 7 March 1988 in Hammond, Illinois.

References

1924 births
1988 deaths
People from Bihar